WTMP may refer to:

 WTMP (AM), a radio station (1150 AM) licensed to serve Egypt Lake, Florida, United States
 WTMP-FM, a radio station (96.1 FM) licensed to serve Dade City, Florida
 Utmp, the UNIX wimp file